Evandromyia is a genus of sand fly first circumscribed in 1941. It is subdivided into three subgenera, which are further subdivided into series.

Subdivisions 
The following subdivisions are accepted as of 2017, unless otherwise cited.
 Subgenus (Aldamyia) Galati, 1995
 Evandromyia aldafalcaoae (Santos, Andrade-Filho & Honer, 2001)
 Evandromyia andersoni (Le Pont & Desjeux, 1988)
 Evandromyia apurinan Shimabukuro, Figueira & Silva, 2013
 Evandromyia bacula (Martins, Falcão & Silva, 1965)
 Evandromyia carmelinoi (Ryan, Fraiha, Lainson & Shaw, 1986)
 Evandromyia dubitans (Sherlock, 1962)
 Evandromyia evandroi (Costa Lima & Antunes, 1936)
 Evandromyia hashiguchii León, Teran, Neira & Le Pont, 2009
 Evandromyia lenti (Mangabeira, 1938)
 Evandromyia orcyi Oliveira, Sanguinette, Almeida & Andrade-Filho, 2015
 Evandromyia sericea (Floch & Abonnenc, 1944)
 Evandromyia termitophila (Martins, Falcão & Silva, 1964)
 Evandromyia walkeri (Newstead, 1914)
 Evandromyia williamsi (Damasceno, Causey & Arouck, 1945)
 Subgenus (Barrettomyia) Martins and Silva, 1968
 Series cortelezzii Galati, 1995
 Evandromyia chacuensis Szelag, Rosa, Galati, Andrade Filho & Salomón, 2018
 Evandromyia cortelezzii (Brèthes, 1923)
 Evandromyia corumbaensis (Galati, Nunes, Oshiro & Rego, 1989)
 Evandromyia sallesi (Galvão & Coutinho, 1939)
 Evandromyia spelunca Carvalho, Brazil, Sanguinette & Andrade-Filho, 2011
 Series monstruosa Lewis, Young & Minter, 1977
 Evandromyia monstruosa (Floch & Abonnenc, 1944)
 Evandromyia teratodes (Martins, Falcão & Silva, 1964)
 Series tupynambai Martins & Silva, 1968
 Evandromyia bahiensis (Mangabeira & Sherlock, 1961)
 Evandromyia callipyga (Martins & Silva, 1965)
 Evandromyia costalimai (Mangabeira, 1942)
 Evandromyia petropolitana (Martins & Silva, 1968)
 Evandromyia tupynambai (Mangabeira, 1942)
 Subgenus (Evandromyia) Mangabeira, 1941
 Series infraspinosa Young & Arias, 1977
 Evandromyia begonae (Ortiz & Torrez, 1975)
 Evandromyia bourrouli (Barretto & Coutinho, 1941)
 Evandromyia brachyphalla (Mangabeira, 1941)
 Evandromyia georgii (Freitas & Barrett, 2002)
 Evandromyia infraspinosa (Mangabeira, 1941)
 Evandromyia inpai (Young & Arias, 1977)
 Evandromyia ledezmaae León, Teran, Neira & Le Pont, 2009
 Evandromyia pinottii (Damasceno & Arouck, 1956)
 Evandromyia sipani (Fernández, Carbajal, Alexander & Need, 1994)
 Evandromyia tarapacaensis (Le Pont, Torrez-Espejo & Galati, 1997)
 Series rupicola Young & Fairchild, 1974
 Evandromyia correalimai (Martins, Coutinho & Luz, 1970)
 Evandromyia gaucha Andrade-Filho, Souza & Falcão, 2007
 Evandromyia grimaldii Andrade-Filho, Pinto, Santos & Carvalho, 2009
 Evandromyia rupicola (Martins, Godoy & Silva, 1962)
 Evandromyia tylophalla Andrade & Galati, 2012
 Series saulensis Lewis, Young & Minter, 1977
 Evandromyia saulensis (Floch & Abonnenc, 1944)
 Evandromyia wilsoni (Damasceno & Causey, 1945)
 Evandromyia incertae sedis
 Evandromyia edwardsi (Mangabeira, 1941)

References 

Psychodidae
Insects of South America
Insect vectors of human pathogens
Insects described in 1941